Valor da Vida (English: Value of Life) is a Portuguese telenovela broadcast and produced by TVI. It was written by Maria João Costa. The telenovela premiered on September 30, 2018 and ended on May 20, 2019. It is recorded between Guimarães, Brasil and Líbano.

Plot 

"Value of Life" takes place in Lebanon, Brazil and Portugal. The story reinforces the importance of living in the present and not in the past, a mistake a lot of characters make, especially Artur and Carolina.

Artur is found in Lebanon. He wakes up without a single recollection. He has no idea who he is, what he's doing there or what happened to him, he can't even remember how his face looks like. When the police discover his identity, he finds out he has been reported dead for twenty years. The plot thickens even further when Arthur returns home and everyone realizes that despite the time passed, he hasn't aged a single day.

Carolina has spent the last eight years in a coma after being in a car accident in which her husband was driving. The doctors don't believe she would ever wake up and wanted to disconnect her from the machines that keeps her alive, but neither her husband or her sister allowed it. Suddenly, she wakes up in the exact moment when her husband and sister are about to announce their relationship.

Artur and Carolina feel completely lost in the world they wake up, having many questions to answer and struggling to leave the past behind.

Seasons

Cast

References

External links

2018 telenovelas
2019 telenovelas
Portuguese telenovelas
Televisão Independente telenovelas
2018 Portuguese television series debuts
2019 Portuguese television series endings
Portuguese-language telenovelas